The football sporting event at the 1923 Far Eastern Championship Games featured matches between China, Japan and the Philippines.

Results

Winner

Statistics

Goalscorers

See also
Football at the Summer OlympicsFootball at the 1935 Central American and Caribbean Games

References

1923 in Japanese football
Football at the Far Eastern Championship Games
International association football competitions hosted by Japan
1923 in Asian football